The Franklin County Courthouse in Pasco, Washington is a historic courthouse which was built in 1912–13.  It was listed on the National Register of Historic Places in 1978.

It is located at 1016 N. 4th St. in Pasco.

It was designed by architects C. Lewis Wilson and Company, of Seattle, Centralia and Chehalis.

Its "central rotunda interior is the most arresting space .... The creme colored marble coupled with azure and gold accents provide a space that is at once comfortable and elegant."

References

External links

Courthouses in Washington (state)
National Register of Historic Places in Franklin County, Washington
Government buildings completed in 1913